Sterol carrier proteins (also known as nonspecific lipid transfer proteins) is a family of proteins that transfer steroids and probably also phospholipids and gangliosides between cellular membranes.

These proteins are different from plant nonspecific lipid transfer proteins but structurally similar to small proteins of unknown function from Thermus thermophilus.

This domain is involved in binding sterols. The human sterol carrier protein 2 (SCP2) is a basic protein that is believed to participate in the intracellular transport of cholesterol and various other lipids.

Human proteins containing this domain 
HSD17B4;   HSDL2;     SCP2;      STOML1;

See also
Steroidogenic acute regulatory protein and START domain

References

External links
Sterol carrier proteins in SCOP
SCP-2 sterol transfer family in Pfam
  
 

Peripheral membrane proteins
Protein domains
Protein families
Water-soluble transporters